Sha Tin Airfield was a small military airfield in Sha Tin, New Territories, Hong Kong, which had a single concrete runway. The airfield was located along the Shing Mun River and looked out to Tide Cove. The airfield served as a Flight (military unit) location for most of the location's existence.

The airfield was destroyed by storm surge from Typhoon Wanda in 1962. It was demolished in the early 1970s as the RAF consolidated their operations at RAF Shek Kong and later re-developed as part of the New Town project for Shatin.

Location
It was located near the Sha Tin station of the Kowloon-Canton Railway British Section, near present-day Hong Kong Heritage Museum and Royal Park Hotel. The airfield was built on the shallow shores of Tide Cove.

History
In 1949, Sha Tin Airfield was built for use by the Royal Air Force (as RAF Shatin). The designation as an RAF airfield was brief and was transferred to the British Army's Army Air Corps (AAC).  In the 1950s and 1960, the AAC rotated in various Air Observation Post Flight units from Britain to Hong Kong:

 No. 20 Independent Reconnaissance Flight
 No. 1900 Independent Air Observation Post Flight RAF
 No. 1903 Air Observation Post Flight RAF
 7 Flight AAC
 8 Flight AAC
 12 Flight AAC
 16 Flight AAC
 25 Flight AAC
 29 Flight AAC

The Air Observation Post were under the command of the 40th Infantry Division. The airfield operated the Auster AOP.6, an aircraft also used by the Royal Hong Kong Auxiliary Air Force.

Belgian pilot Charles den Bron flew his Spirit of Shatin from an airfield in the area in 1911.

During the late 1950s a private club used the airfield to fly RC model airplanes. The club remained at the airfield until 1970.

In 1962, Typhoon Wanda severely damaged much of the site and moved to Kai Tak airport to relocate with the RAF around 1963.  Subsequently, the airfield was demolished in the early 1970s to make way for developing the Sha Tin New Town.

Facilities

The airfield consisted of a single 600-metre runway, direction 05/23. Facilities at the airfield consisted of a small control tower, building and hangars made of corrugated steel sections.  The airfield was abandoned after Typhoon Wanda in 1962.  All the structures were demolished when the station closed in the 1970s. The Air Observation Post Headquarter's building was located at the edge of the Tide Cove facing Tolo Harbour.

The runway is now the site of the Hong Kong Heritage Museum, New Town Plaza Phase 3 and Royal Park Hotel, while the base is currently occupied by Sha Tin Park.

See also
 Military of Hong Kong
 British Forces Overseas Hong Kong
 Sek Kong Airfield
 RAF Kai Tak
 Aviation history of Hong Kong

References

 宋軒麟 (2004), 《香港航空百年》, Hong Kong: Joint Us Press
 http://www.flightglobal.com/pdfarchive/view/1957/1957%20-%201449.html
 http://www.flightglobal.com/pdfarchive/view/1961/1961%20-%200922.html
 http://www.flightglobal.com/pdfarchive/view/1954/1954%20-%201569.html

External links
 Flight Global (PDF)

Airports in Hong Kong
Defunct airports in the United Kingdom
Military of Hong Kong under British rule
Sha Tin
Former buildings and structures in Hong Kong
Military of Hong Kong
1949 establishments in Hong Kong
1970 disestablishments in Hong Kong
Airports established in 1949
Airports disestablished in 1970